Toa Kohe-Love (born 2 December 1976) is a New Zealand former professional rugby league footballer who played as a . Kohe-Love represented Aotearoa Māori at the 2000 Rugby League World Cup.

Early years
After growing up playing rugby union in Wellington Kohe-Love joined the new Auckland Warriors franchise on a development contract in 1995. He then moved to the Warrington Wolves in 1996.

Playing career
Toa Kohe-Love has previously played for the Bradford Bulls, two spells at Widnes Vikings Warrington Wolves, Leigh Centurions and Hull F.C. He is best remembered for two spells with the Warrington Wolves where he was leading try-scorer in the Super League era.

In October 2007 Kohe-Love joined the Leigh Centurions after experiencing defeat in the 2007 National League One Grand Final with the Widnes Vikings. Following the defeat and missing out on a place in the Super League at the last hurdle for a second consecutive year the Widnes Vikings went into administration and were forced to sell most of their star players. Toa Kohe-Love was one of the stars to leave to join the Leigh Centurions along with Denis Moran, Gareth Price, Lee Doran, Mike Morrison and Martin Keavney. He then returned to Widnes in 2009.

Post playing
Toa Kohe-Love is the father of the rugby league footballer who has played for the Warrington Wolves Academy; Joe Kohe-Love.

References

External links
Leigh Centurions Player Profile
Warrington’s World Cup heroes – Toa Kohe-Love

1976 births
Living people
Bradford Bulls players
Hull F.C. players
Leigh Leopards players
New Zealand rugby league players
New Zealand Māori rugby league players
New Zealand Māori rugby league team players
New Zealand expatriate sportspeople in England
Rugby league centres
Rugby league players from Wellington City
Warrington Wolves players
Widnes Vikings players